was a village located in Kashima District, Ibaraki Prefecture, Japan.

As of 2003, the village had an estimated population of 11,416 and a density of 261.65 persons per km². The total area was 43.63 km².

On October 11, 2005, Taiyō, along with the old town of Hokota, and the village of Asahi (all from Kashima District), was merged to create the city of Hokota.

External links
Hokota Official website 

Dissolved municipalities of Ibaraki Prefecture
Hokota, Ibaraki